John Guilbert Avildsen (December 21, 1935 – June 16, 2017) was an American film director. He is perhaps best known for directing Rocky (1976), which earned him the Academy Award for Best Director, and the first three The Karate Kid films. Other films he directed include Joe (1970), Save the Tiger (1973), The Formula (1980), Neighbors (1981), Lean on Me (1989), Rocky V (1990), and 8 Seconds (1994).

Early life
Avildsen was born in Oak Park, Illinois, the son of Ivy (née Guilbert) and Clarence John Avildsen. He was educated at the Hotchkiss School and at New York University.

Career
After starting out as an assistant director on films by Arthur Penn and Otto Preminger, Avildsen's early low-budget feature Joe (1970) received good notices for star Peter Boyle and was a big box-office hit grossing $26 million from a $100,000 budget. Avildsen followed this early success with the low-budget 1971 cult classic comedy film Cry Uncle! (released in the UK as Superdick and on video as American Oddballs), a 1971 American film in the Troma Entertainment library that stars Allen Garfield. This was followed by Save the Tiger (1973), a film nominated for three Oscars, winning Best Actor for star Jack Lemmon.

His greatest success came with Rocky (1976), which he directed working in conjunction with writer and star Sylvester Stallone. The film was a major critical and commercial success, becoming the highest-grossing film of 1976 and garnering ten Academy Award nominations and winning three, including Best Picture and Best Director. Avildsen later returned to direct what was then expected to be the series' final installment, Rocky V (1990).

He directed the mystery-drama The Formula (1980), starring Marlon Brando and George C. Scott, for which he was nominated for Razzie Award for Worst Director.

Avildsen's other films include Neighbors (1981), For Keeps (1988), Lean on Me (1989), The Power of One (1992), 8 Seconds (1994), and the first three The Karate Kid films.

He was the original director for both Serpico (1973) and Saturday Night Fever (1977), but was fired over disputes with, respectively, producers Martin Bregman and Robert Stigwood.

His last film was Inferno (1999), starring Jean-Claude Van Damme.

A documentary on the life, career and films of Avildsen was released in August 2017, approximately two months after his death. John G. Avildsen: King of the Underdogs (2017), directed and produced by Derek Wayne Johnson, features interviews with Sylvester Stallone, Ralph Macchio, Martin Scorsese, Jerry Weintraub, and Burt Reynolds, among others. The documentary is a companion to the book The Films of John G. Avildsen: Rocky, The Karate Kid, and other Underdogs, written by Larry Powell and Tom Garrett.

Personal life
Avildsen's first wife was Marie Olga Maturevich (Melissa McCall). After they divorced, he married actress Tracy Brooks Swope in 1987; they separated in 2006. He had five children. His estranged son, Ash (born November 5, 1981), founded Sumerian Records. Another son, Jonathan Avildsen, appeared in the films The Karate Kid Part III and Rocky V. His eldest son was named Anthony, and he had a daughter, Penelope Avildsen. John also had a daughter with Tracy Swope, named Bridget.

Death
Avildsen died at Cedars-Sinai Medical Center in Los Angeles on June 16, 2017. He was 81. The cause of his death was pancreatic cancer, according to his son Anthony Avildsen.

Filmography

References

External links
 
 

1935 births
2017 deaths
Artists from Oak Park, Illinois
Best Directing Academy Award winners
Deaths from cancer in California
Deaths from pancreatic cancer
Directors Guild of America Award winners
Film directors from Illinois
Hotchkiss School alumni
New York University alumni
American people of Norwegian descent